John McGuinness may refer to:

John McGuinness (baseball) (1857–1916), Irish-born baseball player
Seán McGuinness (died 1978), also known as John McGuinness, Irish republican politician
John McGuinness (politician) (born 1955), Irish Fianna Fáil politician
John McGuinness (bowls) (born 1967), English lawn bowler
John McGuinness (motorcyclist) (born 1972), English professional motorcycle racer